Syed Shāh Muṣṭafā al-Baghdādi, popularly known as Shah Mustafa, is a Sufi Muslim figure in the Sylhet region. Mustafa's name is associated with the spread of Islam into Moulvibazar, part of a long history of travel between the Middle East, Central Asia and South Asia. He took part in the Conquest of Sylhet under Shah Jalal's leadership in 1303. He is also referred to with the Persian sobriquets; Sher-e-Sowar (Tiger Rider) and Chabukmar (Snake Whipper).

Early life and education

Mustafa was born and raised in a traditional Islamic home in Baghdad, Iraq. His paternal grandfather, Syed Ibrahim was a descendant of the Islamic scholar Abdul Qadir Gilani, and the 23rd generation descendant of Ali, the fourth Caliph of Islam. Ibrahim was a resident of Medina in Arabia who later migrated to Baghdad although his son, Syed Sultan, would visit Mecca and Medina often. However, other sources claim that the family had migrated to Baghdad from Mecca. 

Mustafa was the eldest of Syed Sultan's two sons, and began his early education with his father. He also enrolled at a Nezamiyeh and at the Multan Siria Madrasa.

Migration
During Shah Jalal's expedition towards the Indian subcontinent from Hadhramaut in Yemen, Shah Jalal passed through the city of Baghdad, which was under occupation by the Ilkhanate, the southwestern sector of the Mongol Empire ruled by Hulagu Khan. Here, Shah Mustafa and his son, Ismail, met Jalal and decided to accompany him in his expedition following the murder of the last Abbasid caliph Al-Musta'sim in 1258. In 1303, Mustafa and Ismail took part in the third battle of the Conquest of Sylhet under Shah Jalal's leadership.

Following the victory, Shah Jalal ordered Shah Mustafa (along with his son Syed Ismail, his disciple Nur Ali Shah and others) to migrate elsewhere to preach the religion of Islam. They set off southwards, and spent one night in Dayamir. The following day, they reached the village of Tilapara in Mukhtarpur, Burunga where he rested under a large tree near a pond situated in the home of a Hindu family of Brahmins (priests). It was customary for this family to give offerings under the tree everyday for their Devata'''s satisfaction. According to tradition, the priest and his wife had dreamed of the Devata going away and when the family refused to let it go, they said the truth has come, we have no right to stay. Waking up from the dream, they went towards the tree and saw three respectful men. The Brahmin priest had a friendly discussion with them, and accepted Islam. The news of his conversion spread across the area and many more people converted to Islam on that day. On the evening of Mustafa's departure, he left entrusted the new converts to one of his murids (disciples).

He then continued his journey with Ismail and Nur Ali Shah, eventually reaching Chandrapur (modern-day Moulvibazar). Here, Mostafa built a small cottage on top a little hill to live in which was located in a village in close proximity to Borshijura. This area would later become known as Mostafapur, named after himself. The area at this time was governed by Raja Chandra Narayan Singh, who is said to have been a member of the Ita royal family or locally governing under the greater Tripura Kingdom. Mustafa requested permission to live in his kingdom but the Raja did not accept it. Ismail passed away during this period. It is said that from his small cottage, Mustafa would host a hujra and preach to the local people as many people would visit him. Singh was angered after hearing that many people are converting to Islam after attending Shah Mustafa's hujra. He issued a formal directive to Shah Mustafa to vacate from his domain.

One day, a poisonous snake sat itself onto the Raja's throne and none of the Raja's men could get rid of it. Meetings were held in the Raja's palace on top of Satpabiya Hill in Borshijura pondering on how to address this incident. At the same time, as the royal men were busy in the palace, a tiger had entered the marketplaces and was causing havoc across Singh's domain. The news of these incidents reached Shah Mustafa. Mustafa finally departed from his cottage and decided to go to the palace. On the way, he came across the tiger in Borshijura and tamed it in such a way that he rode it as he continued his journey. He then arrived at the palace in Satpabiya and used his chabuk to defeat the snake. The Raja became impressed with Shah Mustafa's courage and then permitted him to remain in his kingdom. As he had no sons, he let Mustafa marry his daughter, who adopted the name of Salma Khatun. It is contested whether the Raja himself accepted Islam. The Raja gifted the Chandrapur kingdom to Mustafa and subsequently built a new palace for himself, just north of Deorachhara Tea Estate in Kamalganj. The ruins of this new palace, just west of the Samerkona village, as well as a large pond known as the Rajar Dighi'' (Raja's lake) remains today.

Personal life
Mustafa had three wives in his lifetime. Whilst in Baghdad, he married a woman of Syeda background and had a son named Syed Ismail. From his marriage with Salma Khatun, daughter of Raja Chandra Narayan Singh, he had a son named Syed Shah Nasrullah, who was also a notable figure. He also married Bibi Hamira, the daughter of Shah Abd Al-Malik of Kanihati, another companion of Shah Jalal, and they had a child called Syed Shah Hasan.

Although he was initiated into the Qadiri order, it is said he followed the tariqah of Suhrawardiyya in his later life as a result of his bay'ah to Shah Jalal.

Legacy
To this day, there are many places named after Shah Mustafa across Moulvibazar District. Most notably, the mazar of the Sufi pir is located in Dargah Mahalla, Moulvibazar. Every year in this dargah, Mustafa's urs is commemorated and has been for nearly 700 years. The event attracts many people and a two-day mela is held around the complex. On the south-western corner of the complex are the dargahs of Shah Mustafa's two nephews, Shah Ismail and Shah Yasin. Raja Chandra Narayan Singh's palaces still remain in Khalilpur and Deorachhara.

Eponyms
 Dargah-e-Shah Mustafa, Dorgah Road
 Mostafapur Union in Moulvibazar Sadar Upazila is named after the village in which Shah Mustafa lived in and preached.
 Shah Mostafa Road, Moulvibazar
 Shah Mustafa Square, opposite Collectorate House
 Shah Mustafa Academy, K B Alauddin Road
 Shah Mustafa Jame Masjid, Rajnagar
 Syed Shah Mustafa College, Shamsher Nagar Road
 Syed Shah Mustafa Hafizia Madrasa, Dorgah Road
 Syed Shah Mustafa Jame Masjid, 16 Crown Terrace, Aberdeen, Scotland, AB11 6HD

Descendants
Most of his descendants reside across the historic Chowallish Pargana in the areas of Mostafapur, Dargah Mahalla, Gavindasri, Dhorkapon, Kazirgaon, Kholapara and Hilalpur, and carry the name of Syed.

Moulvibazar District is named after Moulvi Syed Qudratullah, the son of Syed Hurmotullah who was the descendant of Shah Mustafa's nephew, Shah Yasin.

Another descendant of Shah Mustafa is Syed Muhibullah who was also a notable 'alim during his time who lived in Kazi Elias Para, Sylhet with his son Syed Abdul Jalil. Abdul Jalil's son was Syed Abdul Majid (Kaptan Miah) who was a famous politician born in 1872. Abdul Majid was an elite who was invited to attend the Delhi Durbar of 1911 during Emperor George V's visit to the subcontinent as well as the All India Muhammadan Educational Conference and given titles such as Companion of the Order of the Indian Empire and Khan Bahadur by the British Empire.

See also 
Moulvi Syed Qudratullah
Shah Jalal
Syed Abdul Majid

References

Indian people of Arab descent
Indian people of Iraqi descent
People from Baghdad
1336 deaths
14th-century Indian Muslims
Bengali Sufi saints